Fraydele Oysher (October 3, 1913 – January 5, 2004) was an American Yiddish theater actress and musical performer. She was one of the first female singers to publicly perform cantorial music. She was the mother of American actress and comedian Marilyn Michaels and Michael Sternberg, the sister of American actor and cantor Moishe Oysher, and the wife of Harold Sternberg, a Broadway and Metropolitan Opera performer. Throughout her career, she performed in the United States, Canada, South America, and Cuba.

Life and work

Early life 
Oysher was born in Lipkon, Bessarabia, Imperial Russia, which is now part of Moldova. She was the daughter of a cantor. As a child, Fraydele and her brother Moishe were taught synagogue chants by their father, Selig Oysher, and were immersed in religious music. The Oysher family immigrated to the United States when Fraydele and Moishe were children.

Performance career 
Oysher worked as a child actress, performing in musicals written specifically for her at Yiddish theaters in New York City, among them The Little Queen, The Golden Girl, and Fraydele's Wedding. Frequently, she played the role of the Yeshiva boy who is later revealed to be a girl.

After moving to New York, Oysher performed in Louis Kramer's acting troupe at the Amphion Theatre, on radio, and in concerts.

Personal life 
She and Harold Sternberg married in 1935. Sternberg performed at the Metropolitan Opera as a basso profundo opera singer. Oysher had two children, daughter Marilyn Michaels and son Michael Sternberg.

References

External links 
 Guide to the Papers of Fraydele Oysher, YIVO Institute for Jewish Research, New York

1913 births
2004 deaths
People from Briceni District
People from Khotinsky Uyezd
Moldovan Jews
Emigrants from the Russian Empire to the United States
American people of Moldovan-Jewish descent
Jewish American actresses
Yiddish theatre performers
20th-century American women
20th-century American people
20th-century American Jews
21st-century American Jews
21st-century American women